François-Henri Salomon de Virelade (4 October 1620, Bordeaux – 2 March 1670, Bordeaux) was a French lawyer. He was elected the third occupant of Académie française seat 29 in 1644.

1620 births
1670 deaths
17th-century French lawyers
Members of the Académie Française